Rangabali is an Upazila of Patuakhali District in the Division of Barisal, Bangladesh.

Location
Rangabali Upazila is located in the southernmost part of Patuakhali District in the chars of the Bay of Bengal.  Chalitabunia and Agunmukha rivers and Char Biswas in the north, Ramnabad Channel and Kalapara Upazila in the west, Char Kurri-Mukri in Char Fasson Upazila in the east and Bay of Bengal in the south.

Administrative Areas 
At present there are 6 unions in Rangabali upazila.  Administrative activities of the whole upazila are under Rangabali police station.

Unions:

 Rangabali Sadar Union
 Boro Baishadia Union
 Chhoto Baishdia Union
 Char Momtaz Union
 Chalitabunia Union
 Maudubi Union (formed from Bara Baishadia Union)

History 

Naming of Upazila: The exact history of naming of Rangabali upazila is not known.  However, it is said that due to the creation of new shelf in the sea, the sand of this shelf was red in the evolution of time. The word 'red' is locally known as 'ranga'. This is the origin of the name "Rangabali". Historians say that in 184, some Rakhine people fled the state of Arakan and settled in the area. From then on, settlement started in this area.

Origin of the Upazila: The administrative approval of Rangabali Upazila was given on 6 June 2011 at the 105th meeting of Nikar (National Implementation Committee for Administration Reform). Following this, Bangladesh Gazette was published on 13 June 2011. The Upazila was inaugurated in 2012.

Demographics 
The current population as per 2011 census is 103,003. Of this the entire population is rural. Muslims make up 101,046 (98.10%) and Hindus 1,868 (1.81%).

Notable Social Organizations 
 Rangabali Press Club
 Rangabali Youth Society (RYS)

References 

Upazilas of Patuakhali District
Islands of Bangladesh
Islands of the Bay of Bengal
Populated places in Bangladesh